Alexander Gyan is a Ghanaian politician and member of parliament for the Kintampo South constituency in the Bono East region of Ghana.

Early life and education 
Alexander was born on 26 March 1980 and hails from Ampomah-Kintampo South in the Bono East region of Ghana. He had his SSSCE in 1999. He further had his BSc. in Agriculture Education in 2012.

Career 
Alexander was the District Chief Executive at the Ministry of Local Government and Rural Development for Kintampo South District.

Political career 
Alexander is a member of NPP and currently the MP for Kintampo South Constituency.

Committees 
Alexander is a member of the Government Assurance Committee and also a member of the Communications Committee.

Philanthropy 
In November 2021, Alexander provided free food and transportation to about 1357 students who were BECE candidates in the Kintampo South constituency.

Controversy 
In October 2020 when he was the then DCE of the Kintampo South District, he presented an award to his father as the 'best farmer' in the district. According to Mathew Atanga, a Communication's officer for NDC claimed other deserving farmers were robbed in a statement.

References 

Living people
1980 births
New Patriotic Party politicians
Ghanaian MPs 2021–2025